Events from the year 1872 in Russia.

Incumbents
 Monarch – Alexander II

Events

 A.S. Popov Central Museum of Communications
 Grazhdanin
 Special Tribunal of the Ruling Senate
 Kuopion Lyseon lukio
 Maaninka
 Moscow State Pedagogical University
 Mshak

Births

Deaths

References

1872 in Russia
Years of the 19th century in the Russian Empire